The Globe class is a series of 10 container ships originally built for Mitsui O.S.K. Lines (MOL) and later operated by Ocean Network Express (ONE). The ships were built by Hyundai Samho Heavy Industries in South Korea. The ships have a maximum theoretical capacity of around 5,605 twenty-foot equivalent units (TEU).

List of ships

See also 
MOL Triumph-class container ship
MOL Bravo-class container ship
MOL Creation-class container ship
MOL Maestro-class container ship

References 

Container ship classes
Ships built by Hyundai Heavy Industries Group